was a Japanese samurai warrior of the late Sengoku period and early Edo period. He was the son of Hosokawa Fujitaka with Numata Jakō, and he was the husband of a famous Christian convert (Kirishitan), Hosokawa Gracia. For most of his life, he went under the name of Nagaoka Tadaoki that had been adopted by his father and was related to a town that was in their domain. Shortly after the victory at Sekigahara, Nagaoka Tadaoki reverted to his original name Hosokawa Tadaoki.

Biography
Tadaoki was the eldest son of Hosokawa Fujitaka.  He fought in his first battle at the age of 15.  In that battle, he was in the service of Oda Nobunaga. His childhood name was Kumachiyo (熊千代).
Tadaoki was given the Province of Tango in 1580.  Soon after that, he married Hosokawa Gracia, the daughter of Akechi Mitsuhide. 

In 1582, Akechi Mitsuhide rebelled against Nobunaga and Nobunaga was killed. Akechi turned to Hosokawa Fujitaka and Hosokawa Tadaoki for help. They refused to help him, later Mitsuhide was defeated by Hideyoshi.

Tadaoki was present on Hideyoshi's side in the Battle of Komaki and Nagakute (1584) and the Odawara Campaign (1590), where he took part in the siege of Nirayama (Izu Province) and later joined the main army outside Odawara. During the 1590s he became friends with Tokugawa Ieyasu (who had lent him money to assist in some debts owed Toyotomi Hidetsugu) and in 1600 sided with him against Ishida Mitsunari.

He was succeeded by Hosokawa Tadatoshi (1586–1641), who was present at the Siege of Shimabara (1637–1638). In 1632 Tadatoshi received a huge fief in Higo (Kumamoto, 540,000 koku), where the Hosokawa family remained until 1871.

Battle of Sekigahara

In July 1600, Ishida Mitsunari had attempted to gain some leverage over those leaning towards Ieyasu by taking as hostages all those whose families were in Osaka Castle, this happened to include Tadaoki's wife, who was by now a Christian, baptized "Gracia". To avoid capture, Hosokawa Gracia ordered a servant to kill her and set fire to their quarters. While there is little reason to believe that Tadaoki was emotionally scarred by the incident, it was considered an appalling act of trickery, and served to drive Tadaoki into Ieyasu's side.

On October 20, 1600 at the Battle of Sekigahara, Tadaoki commanded 5,000 men in the Tokugawa vanguard and clashed with the forces of Shima Sakon. Afterwards, He was awarded a fief in Buzen (Kokura, 370,000 koku) and went on to serve at the Siege of Osaka (1614–1615).

Family
 Father: Hosokawa Fujitaka
 Mother: Numata Jako (1544-1618)
 Wife: Hosokawa Gracia
 Concubines:
 Daughter of Kori Muneyasu
 Daughter of Akechi Mitsutada
 Daughter of Kiyota Mamoru
 Daughter of Masashi Shimamoto
 Children:
 Hosokawa Tadataka (1580-1646) by Hosokawa Gracia
 Hosokawa Okiaki (1583-1615) by Hosokawa Gracia
 Hosokawa Tadatoshi by Hosokawa Gracia
 Hosokawa Okitaka
 Hosokawa Tatsutaka by daughter of Kiyota Mamoru
 Matsui Yoriyuki
 Ocho married Maeno Kagesada by Hosokawa Gracia
 Otara married Inaba Kazumichi by Hosokawa Gracia
 Koho married Matsui Okinaga
 Oman married Karasuma Mitsukata

Retainers
 Ujii Yashiro

See also
 Hosokawa clan

References

External links
 Sengoku Biographical Dictionary  Hosokawa Tadaoki

Further reading
 Sansom, George  "A History of Japan", 1334–1615 Stanford 1961
 Berry, Mary Elizabeth  "Hideyoshi" 1982
 Charles Ralph Boxer, "Hosokawa Tadaoki and the Jesuits, 1587–1645" in Portuguese Merchants and Missionaries in Feudal Japan, 1543–1640, by Variorum Reprints (1986)

|-

Daimyo
1563 births
1646 deaths
Higo-Hosokawa clan
Ōshū-Hosokawa clan
Toyotomi retainers
Deified Japanese people
17th-century military history of Japan